is a golf video game developed by Sega for the PlayStation 3. It was released in Japan as part of the console's launch titles on November 11, 2006.

References

External links 
 Official website

2006 video games
Golf video games
PlayStation 3-only games
Japan-exclusive video games
PlayStation 3 games
Video games developed in Japan